Kate Calloway (born 1957) is an American author of crime fiction. Her stories feature a lesbian detective, Cassidy James.

Works
 First Impressions, 1996
 Second Fiddle, 1997
 Third Degree, 1997
 Fourth Down, 1997
 Fifth Wheel, 1998
 Sixth Sense, 1999
 Seventh Heaven, 1999
 Eighth Day, 2001

References

1957 births
Living people
American crime writers
Date of birth missing (living people)